The Black Dragon fire, also known as the 1987 Daxing'anling wildfire was the deadliest forest fire in the People's Republic of China. The fire broke out in Daxing'anling Prefecture, Heilongjiang on May 6, 1987. It also spread into the Soviet Union. The burning lasted almost a month, when it was finally stopped on June 2, 1987. About 266 people were wounded and 211 died in the fire leaving 50,000 homeless. It was one of the largest wildfires ever to occur, and the largest to strike China in over 300 years.

The fire 
The Black Dragon fire originated in the coniferous Da Hinggan Forests in the Greater Khingan Range, a mountain range in northeastern China. In 1987, the area surrounding the Amur River in the region had been unusually hot and was experiencing a drought, leading to an overabundance of parched vegetation. These conditions were ideal for a large wildfire to occur. Because the area was sparsely populated at the time, the exact cause of the fire was not very clear at first; any small ignition could have turned into a major firestorm in the conditions present. Later and widely believed Chinese reports state that the fire was started "when an untrained 18-year-old worker accidentally ignited gas spilled from his brush cutter." According to Harrison Salisbury, the roots of the disaster lay in excessive cutting down of trees without any effort to let the forest regrow, which triggered multiple fires in the region. Whatever the causes were, the resulting firestorm quickly gained momentum, fueled by high winds in the region. Workers reported their truck engines stopping as the fire deprived the oxygen supply in the air as well as burning projectiles raining down on them ahead of the fire. A total of 191 people were killed by the fire, and a further 250 were left injured. In addition, 33,000 Chinese were made homeless. It remains the deadliest forest fire in the People's Republic of China.

Response 
Although both countries were affected heavily by the fire, China and the Soviet Union responded very differently. China, despite its shortage of advanced firefighting equipment, sent over 60,000 soldiers and workers to try and extinguish the fire. Because the forest was a major source of wood for China as well as the fact that it was close to the Gobi desert and thus a factor in desertification in northern China, China spent much effort on extinguishing the flames. The Soviet Union, on the other hand, simply let the fire burn out on its side of the border because its vast timber reserves were not seriously threatened by the fire. When the fire finally stopped over a month later, the differences in responses were clear: The Soviet Union had lost more forest (15 million acres compared to 3 million in China), while China was more devastated economically.

In the aftermath, China punished individuals for causing the fire; the aforementioned 18-year-old worker, along with his employer, were jailed. The forestry minister was fired. In addition, a local fire chief who saved his house and left the rest of his town to burn was sentenced to four years in prison. 

The lessons learned from the Black Dragon fire helped to improve response to wildfires throughout the world as well as demonstrate the impact that governments can have on the environment. The effect that the fire had on the environment in the region generated new found concern and speculation about the future about the forest's ecology.

References

Further reading
 

Wildfires in China
1987 disasters in China
1987 fires in Asia
1987 natural disasters
1987 wildfires
History of Heilongjiang